Lobithelphusa mexicana is a species of crab in the family Pseudothelphusidae, the only species in the genus Lobithelphusa.

References

Pseudothelphusidae
Monotypic arthropod genera